Le Tigre is an American brand of apparel designed to rival Lacoste in styling. First offered in 1977, Le Tigre polos sported a leaping tiger in lieu of Lacoste's signature crocodile and Retro Fox's leaping fox. The brand made a comeback in 2003, after being out of production through the 1990s. Le Tigre had become popular during the later 1980s; celebrities from Wilt Chamberlain, LL Cool J, and even Ronald Reagan were seen wearing the tiger. The company is based in New York City.  Le Tigre has been a subsidiary of Kenneth Cole Productions since 2007. The brand was then purchased by Infinity Lifestyle Brands and Hilco Brands in November 2015.

Notes

References

Sportswear brands
1980s fashion
Clothing brands of the United States
Companies based in New York City
Clothing companies established in 1977
1977 establishments in New York (state)
2000s fashion